Carlos Cordero Pérez (born 26 September 1996) is a Spanish footballer who plays for CD Badajoz as a left back.

Club career
Born in Almendralejo, Badajoz, Extremadura, Cordero made his senior debut with UD Fuente de Cantos during the 2015–16 season, in Tercera División. On 30 June 2016, he signed a three-year deal with Sporting de Gijón and was assigned to the B-team also in the fourth division.

Cordero made his first team debut on 23 November 2018, starting in a 2–1 Segunda División away win against Granada CF. Ahead of the 2019–20 campaign, he was definitely promoted to the main squad.

On 14 September 2020, Cordero agreed to a two-year contract with Segunda División B side Marbella FC, after terminating his contract with Sporting.

Career Statistics

References

External links

1996 births
Living people
People from Almendralejo
Spanish footballers
Footballers from Extremadura
Association football defenders
Segunda División players
Segunda División B players
Tercera División players
Sporting de Gijón B players
Sporting de Gijón players
Marbella FC players